PowerVM, formerly known as Advanced Power Virtualization (APV), is a chargeable feature of IBM POWER5, POWER6, POWER7, POWER8, POWER9 and Power10 servers and is required for support of micro-partitions and other advanced features.  Support is provided for IBM i, AIX and Linux.

Description 
 
IBM PowerVM has the following components:
 A "VET" code, which activates firmware required to support resource sharing and other features.
 Installation media for the Virtual I/O Server (VIOS), which is a service partition providing sharing services for disk and network adapters.

Prior to its withdrawal from marketing in 2011, PowerVM also came with installation media for Lx86, x86 binary translation software, which allows Linux applications compiled for the Intel x86 platform to run in POWER-emulation mode. A supported Linux distribution was a co-requisite for use of this feature.

IBM PowerVM comes in two editions:
 IBM PowerVM Standard: supported on all POWER6, POWER7 and POWER8 systems. Unrestricted use of partitioning – 10× LPARs per core (20× LPARs for Power7+ and Power8 servers) (up to a maximum of 1,000 per system). Multiple Shared Processor Pools (on POWER7 and POWER8 systems only). This is the most common edition in use on production systems.
 IBM PowerVM Enterprise: supported on POWER7 and POWER8 systems only. As PowerVM Standard, but with the addition of Live Partition Mobility (which allows running virtual machines to migrate to another system) and Active Memory Sharing (which intelligently reallocates physical memory between multiple running virtual machines).

Prior to its withdrawal from marketing in August 1, 2014, a third edition, IBM PowerVM Express, was also available. Intended primarily for "sandbox" environments, it was only supported on "Express" servers (e.g. Power 710/730, 720/740, 750 and Power Blades), limited to three partitions (one of which must be a VIOS partition), and with no support for Multiple Shared Processor Pools.

See also 
 Comparison of platform virtualization software
 IBM High Availability Cluster Multiprocessing
 Linux on Power
 Kernel-based Virtual Machine - a linux based virtual machine which is developing PowerPC support

References

External links 
 IBM Redbooks | PowerVM Virtualization on IBM System p: Introduction and Configuration 
 IBM Redbooks | PowerVM Virtualization on IBM System p: Managing and Monitoring 

Virtualization software
IBM software